Anthem of the Sun is the second album by rock band the Grateful Dead, released in 1968 on Warner Bros/Seven Arts. It is the first album to feature second drummer Mickey Hart. The band was also joined by Tom Constanten, who contributed avant-garde instrumental and studio techniques influenced by composers John Cage and Karlheinz Stockhausen.

The album was assembled through a collage-like editing approach helmed by members Jerry Garcia and Phil Lesh (along with soundman Dan Healy), in which disparate studio and live performance tapes were spliced together to create new hybrid recordings. The band also supplemented their performances with instruments such as prepared piano, kazoo, harpsichord, timpani, trumpet, and güiro. The result is an experimental amalgam that is neither a studio album nor a live album, but both at the same time.

In 1972, a more commercial alternate mix of the album was officially released to capitalize on the band's recent success. A 2018 reissue on Rhino Records collects both the 1968 and 1972 mixes. The album was ranked number 288 on Rolling Stone magazine's list of the 500 greatest albums of all time, in both the 2003 and 2012 iterations of the list. It was voted number 376 in Colin Larkin's All Time Top 1000 Albums.

Recording
The band entered American Studios in Los Angeles in November 1967 with David Hassinger, the producer of their eponymous debut album. However, determined to make a more complicated recorded work than their debut release, as well as attempt to translate their live sound into the studio, the band and Hassinger changed locations to New York City. By December they had gone through two other studios, Century Sound and Olmstead Studios (both "highly regarded eight-track studios").

Eventually, Hassinger grew frustrated with the group's slow recording pace and quit the project entirely while the band was at Century Sound, with only a third of the album completed. It has been reported that he left after guitarist Bob Weir requested creating the illusion of "thick air" in the studio by mixing recordings of silence taken in the desert and the city. Hassinger commented that "Nobody could sing [the new tracks recorded in NYC], and at that point they were experimenting too much in my opinion. They didn't know what the hell they were looking for." Garcia noted that "we want[ed] to learn how the studio work[ed]. We [didn't] want somebody else doing it. It's our music, we want[ed] to do it."

Returning to San Francisco's Coast Recorders, the band recruited their soundman, Dan Healy, to help produce. In between studio sessions, the band also began recording their live dates. Lesh commented that this was in part because the songs were not "road tested." Healy, Garcia, and Lesh then took these concert tapes (encompassing two Los Angeles shows from November 1967, a tour of the Pacific Northwest in January and early February 1968, and a California tour from mid-February to mid-March 1968) and began interlacing them with existing studio tracks. Garcia called this "mix[ing] it for the hallucinations". Kreutzmann explained, "Phil and Jerry were the ones who figured out that we could exploit studio technology to demonstrate how these songs were mirrors of infinity, even when they adhered to their established arrangements. It's the old paradox of 'improvisational compositions'. Jazz artists knew all about the balance between freedom and structure, but a few rock bands were now catching on. Most rock bands, however, tended to head in an opposite direction, afraid of the uncertainty of improvisation. We decided that Anthem of the Sun was going to be our statement on the matter". Drummer Bill Kreutzmann's description of the production process describes the listening experience of the album as well: ...Jerry [Garcia] and Phil [Lesh] went into the studio with [Dan] Healy and, like mad scientists, they started splicing all the versions together, creating hybrids that contained the studio tracks and various live parts, stitched together from different shows, all in the same song — one rendition would dissolve into another and sometimes they were even stacked on top of each other... It was easily our most experimental record, it was groundbreaking in its time, and it remains a psychedelic listening experience to this day."

Tom Constanten, a friend of Lesh and Garcia, joined the band in the studio while on leave from the United States Air Force to provide piano, prepared piano, and electronic tape effects influenced by John Cage and Stockhausen. Constanten would formally join the band following his discharge in November 1968; however, his contributions to the band's sound were more evident in the studio than in live shows, and Anthem of the Sun was no exception. Constanten developed piano pieces that sounded like three gamelan orchestras playing at once and created effects by setting a spinning gyroscope on the piano soundboard. Likewise, the rest of the band used a large assortment of instruments in the studio to augment the live tracks that were the base of each song, including kazoos, crotales, harpsichord, timpani, trumpet, and a güiro. Garcia commented that parts of the album were "far out, even too far out... We weren't making a record in the normal sense; we were making a collage." He also acknowledged the influence of Lesh's study of Stockhausen and other avant-gardists. Warner Bros. executive Joe Smith was noted as characterizing Anthem of the Sun as "the most unreasonable project with which we have ever involved ourselves."

Jerry Garcia's longtime friend and songwriting partner, Robert Hunter, had made his first lyrical contributions to the band the previous year for "Dark Star". He added words to the Lesh/Pigpen composition "Alligator" on this album.

Release

As much as the entire album can be seen as an "Anthem", it is one of rock music's earliest song cycles, or perhaps concept albums. The front cover art, by Bill Walker, resembles a mandala and incorporates the likenesses of the band members' heads. The back cover features a  circular fisheye group shot, photographed by Thomas Weir.

On the original pressing, all of the songs were credited to the band as a whole. Individual writing credits were subsequently published. In order to increase royalty points on the album, the band divided opening track "That's It for the Other One" into four somewhat arbitrary movements. The opening section, the Garcia-sung "Cryptical Envelopment", was dropped from live performances of the suite after 1971 (though it reappeared a few times in 1985). The second section, ostensibly a quodlibet (misspelled as "quadlibet"), is a short jam connecting to the main section, sung by Weir ("Spanish lady comes to me, she lays on me this rose"), with a short reprise of "Cryptical Envelopment". Though labeled as "The Faster We Go, the Rounder We Get", played live, Weir's section became known simply as "The Other One". The final section is a Constanten piece featuring the aforementioned prepared piano and sound effects (this section is missing from the album cover on original pressings).

The "Dark Star" single, released just prior to Anthem of the Sun, is not included on the album, but its B-side, "Born Cross-Eyed", is included in a stereo mix, without the "Feedback" ending.

Early pressings of the album include the phrase "The faster we go, the rounder we get" inscribed on the vinyl in the run-out matrix around the label area. This was the inspiration for Rounder Records' name.

The album was remastered for the 2001 box set The Golden Road. This version includes four bonus tracks (the single version of "Born Cross-Eyed" plus contemporaneous live tracks) and was issued separately in 2003.

The making of Anthem of the Sun, Aoxomoxoa, Workingman's Dead, and American Beauty is described by former members and associates of the Grateful Dead in the 1997 Classic Albums documentary Anthem to Beauty.

Locations
While no certain date for the beginning of recording is known, it is unlikely that any material was recorded before September 19, 1967, the date when Mickey Hart first played with the band. The melange of the final product makes it difficult to tell where many of the live excerpts listed in the credits were used. However, significant fragments of "Alligator" (e.g. the post-vocals "jam section") are known to come from the February 14, 1968, show at San Francisco's Carousel Ballroom (the venue that later became the Fillmore West). The "Alligator" vocal reprise is taken from November 10, 1967, at the Shrine Auditorium in Los Angeles. Similarly, the skeletal framework of "Caution (Do Not Stop on Tracks)" dates from the  Shrine Auditorium on November 10, 1967, and the Carousel Ballroom on March 31, 1968. Excerpts from two shows at Kings Beach Bowl in Lake Tahoe, California, on February 23–24, 1968, that were used — most notably the car horn heard at the end of "Caution (Do Not Stop on Tracks)" — were later released on Dick's Picks Volume 22. Another show known to be sourced, from March 17, 1968, was released as Download Series Volume 6. Used from that performance were the verse(s) section of "The Faster We Go" portion of "That's It for the Other One", and the first half of the "New Potato Caboose" jam (after the vocals).

Studios used:
RCA Victor Studio A, Hollywood, California, September 1967
American Recording Company, Studio City, California, October 1967
Century Sound Studio, New York, New York, December 1967
Olmstead Sound Studios, New York, New York, December 1967
Criteria Recording Studios, Miami, Florida, April 1968

Live tracks recorded at (according to liner notes):
Shrine Exposition, Los Angeles, California, November 10–11, 1967   (see also 30 Trips Around the Sun & the vinyl-only breakout release)
Eureka Municipal Auditorium, Eureka, California, January 20, 1968   (see also Road Trips Volume 2 Number 2)
Eagles Auditorium, Seattle, Washington, January 26–27, 1968 
Crystal Ballroom, Portland, Oregon, February 2–3, 1968   (see also Road Trips Volume 2 Number 2)
Carousel Ballroom, San Francisco, California, February 14, March 15–17, March 29–31, 1968  (see also Download Series Volume 6)
Kings Beach Bowl, Lake Tahoe, California, February 22–24, 1968   (see also Dick's Picks Volume 22)

The February 14, 1968, recording at Carousel Ballroom has been used to create sound patches for Moog Music's award-winning Animoog app.

Bonus tracks on the 2001/2003 reissue recorded at:
Shrine Exposition, Los Angeles, California, August 23, 1968   (see also Two from the Vault)

Remix and alternate cover

A remixed version of Anthem of the Sun, supervised by Phil Lesh, was issued in 1972 (with the same product number, WS-1749), and can be identified by the letters RE after the master numbers.  The remix particularly differs from the original in terms of segues, use of live recordings, and stereo imaging.  For example, the original mix starts with vocals and organ panned wide, while the remix has them centered; Bob Weir's studio vocal on the first track is doubled with a live recording on the original mix and solo on the remix. "Born Cross-Eyed" ends with a power chord in the key of E on the remix, whereas the original mix has an earlier fade-out.

Around the same time Jerry Garcia supervised a remix of the Grateful Dead's following album Aoxomoxoa.  While the Aoxomoxoa remix was used for original Warner Bros and subsequent Rhino CD issues, the original mix of Anthem of the Sun was chosen for CD reissues.

In 2013 the Grateful Dead studio albums were remastered again for listening in digital high resolution.  The 2013 download is the first digital issue of the Anthem of the Sun early '70s remix.  Confusingly, the promotion for this reissue emphasized the use of original mixes (particularly those of the Workingman's Dead and American Beauty albums which had been remixed for previous high resolution digital releases).  However, Anthem of the Sun and Aoxomoxoa appear in the 2013 HD release not in their original mixes, but in remixed form, as released in 1972.

As remix masters were not sent to the UK, vinyl pressings of the album in this region (and probably other foreign markets) continued to use the original mix after 1972.

When the album was reissued in 1975, Warner Brothers changed the background color on the front cover from midnight blue to white, and the stylized title was changed to a standard font. As the band had not approved the change, the following pressings reverted to blue.

On July 13, 2018 Rhino Records released the "50th Anniversary Deluxe Edition" of Anthem of the Sun, on two CDs.  Disc one contains both mixes of the album – the one from 1968 and the one from 1971.  Disc two contains previously unreleased live tracks from the Winterland Arena in San Francisco, recorded on October 22, 1967.

Track listing

Notes:
Certain track lengths are altered on the 1972 remix of the album:
"Born Cross-Eyed" – 2:27
"Caution (Do Not Stop on Tracks)" – 8:58
Disc one, tracks 6-8 recorded live on August 23, 1968. Also released as the bonus disc of Two from the Vault.

Personnel
Grateful Dead
Jerry Garcia – lead guitar, acoustic guitar, kazoo, vibraslap, vocals, co-lead vocals on "That's It for the Other One" and "Born Cross-Eyed"
Mickey Hart – drums, orchestra bells, gong, chimes, crotales, prepared piano, finger cymbals
Bill Kreutzmann – drums, glockenspiel, gong, chimes, crotales, prepared piano, finger cymbals
Phil Lesh – bass guitar, trumpet, harpsichord, kazoo, piano, timpani, vocals
Ron "Pigpen" McKernan – Hammond and Vox organs, celesta, claves, vocals, lead vocals on "Alligator" and "Caution"
Bob Weir – rhythm guitar, 12-string guitar, acoustic guitar, kazoo, vocals, lead vocals on "New Potato Caboose", co-lead vocals on "That's It for the Other One" and "Born Cross-Eyed"

Additional personnel
Tom Constanten – prepared piano, piano, electronic tape

Production
Grateful Dead – producers, arrangers
David Hassinger – producer
Dan Healy – executive engineer
Bob Matthews – assistant engineer

Reissue technical personnel
James Austin – production
Joe Gastwirt – mastering, production consultation
Michael Wesley Johnson – associate production, research coordination
Cassidy Law – project coordination, Grateful Dead Archive
Eileen Law – archival research, Grateful Dead Archives
David Lemieux – production
Peter McQuaid – executive production, Grateful Dead Productions
Jeffrey Norman – additional mixing on bonus tracks

Chart positions

See also
 San Francisco Sound

References

1968 albums
Albums produced by David Hassinger
Grateful Dead albums
Rhino Records albums
Warner Records albums
Works for prepared piano
Acid rock albums
Sound collage albums